The Encyclopedia of Yverdon (in French: Encyclopédie, ou Dictionnaire universel raisonné des connaissances humaines) is an encyclopedia compiled by Fortunato Bartolomeo de Félice and published in 58 volumes from 1770 through 1780 in Yverdon-les-Baines, Switzerland. The Encyclopedia of Yverdon is not as culturally French nor as philosophically skeptical of religion as the work it is based upon, the Encyclopédie of Diderot and d'Alembert. Due to these differences, the Encyclopedia of Yverdon was known as the Protestant encyclopedia and was widely distributed across Northern Europe.

Principal contributors
The Italian scholar Fortunato de Félice emigrated to Bern, Switzerland, in 1757 and finally resettled in Yverdon, Switzerland, in 1762. To advance his encyclopedia, Félice  brought together more than thirty international collaborators. Fifteen of his contributors were Swiss, twelve French, three German, one Italian, and one Irish. They include:

 Jean-Henri Andrié: contributed more than 4,200 articles on Geography.
 Charles-Louis-François Andry
 Elie Bertrand
 Carlo Barletti
 Louis de Bons
 Jean-Henri-Nicolas Bouillet
 Nicolas-Maximilien Bourgeois
 Louis Claude Cadet de Gassicourt
 Alexandre César Chavannes
 Jacques-Antoine-Henri Deleuze: contributed 1,030 articles on botany and natural history.
 Johann Heinrich Samuel Formey
 Henri-Sébastien Dupuy de Bordes
 Leonhard Euler
 Johann Euler
 André Ferry
 Hieronymus David Gaubius
 Mathieu-Bernard Goudin
 Gottlieb Emanuel von Haller
 Albrecht von Haller
 Samuel-Rodolphe Jeanneret
 Joseph Jérôme Lefrançois de Lalande
 Lecuyer
 Paul-Gabriel Le Preux
 Joseph Lieutaud
 Antoine Louis
 Archibald Maclaine 
 Pierre-Joseph Macquer
 Gabriel Mingard
 David Perrelet
 Antoine Portal
 Johann Rudolf Sinner
 Jacob Reinhold Spielmann
 Johann Christoph Erich von Springer
 Vincent-Bernard de Tscharner
 Paul-Joseph Vallet
 Pierre-Jacques Willermoz

The Encyclopedia of Yverdon by the numbers
 published from 1770 through 1780
 58 quarto volumes
 42 volumes of articles
 6 volumes of supplemental articles
 10 volumes of plates, with 1200 figures
 about 37,378 pages
 about 75,000 articles
 sales: between 2,500 and 3,000 copies

Bibliography
 

 Donato, Clorinda et Doig, Kathleen, Notices sur les auteurs des quarante-huit volumes de "Discours" de l'Encyclopédie d'Yverdon, Recherches sur Diderot et sur l'Encyclopédie, 1991, n° 11, p. 133-141.
 Jean-Daniel Candaux, Alain Cernuschi et al., L'encyclopédie d'Yverdon et sa résonance européenne : contextes, contenus, continuités, Genève, Slatkine, 2005
 Léonard Burnand,  Alain Cernuschi, Circulation de matériaux entre l'Encyclopédie d'Yverdon et quelques dictionnaires spécialisés. In : Dix-huitième siècle, 2006, n° 38, p. 253 à 267.

References

External links 
 Encyclopédie ou Dictionnaire universel raisonné des connoissances humaines, Volume 18 sur Google Books
 L'Encyclopédie d'Yverdon : une entreprise internationale

French encyclopedias
Enlightenment philosophy
18th-century encyclopedias